Karl Georg Otto Willibald von Kalckstein (14 December 1812 – 6 June 1894) was a Prussian politician.

Kalckstein was born in Gauten, East Prussia, to Carl von Kalckstein, laird of Knauten, Wogau and Schloditten near Mühlhausen, and Charlotte Auguste von Gizycki.

Around 1830, Kalckstein joined the Prussian Army and became an Officer of the Royal Guards Regiment in Berlin. About 1842 he returned to his family's manor at Wogau. In 1848 he was elected as deputy member of the Frankfurt Parliament of the election district Heiligenbeil/Pr. Eylau and became a member of the Parliament on 11 October 1848 after the delegate Graf Dohna-Lauck resigned his position.

From 1858 till 1876 Kalckstein was the head of the administration of the district of Pr. Eylau (Landrat) and member of the North German Confederation parliament and the Reichstag from 1867 - 1873.

Kalckstein died in Wogau.

References 
 Horst Schulz, "Pr. Eylau, eine Kreisstadt in Ostpreussen", Verden/Aller 1998, p. 240

1812 births
1894 deaths
People from Kaliningrad Oblast
People from East Prussia
German untitled nobility
German Protestants
German Conservative Party politicians
Members of the Frankfurt Parliament
Members of the 1st Reichstag of the German Empire